Harsha Eranga Vithana (born August 15, 1985) in Galle is a Sri Lankan first class cricketer. A right-handed batsman, he previously captained his country at the under-19 level. He made his Twenty20 debut on 17 August 2004, for Colts Cricket Club in the 2004 SLC Twenty20 Tournament.

References

External links 
 

1985 births
Bloomfield Cricket and Athletic Club cricketers
Colts Cricket Club cricketers
Galle Cricket Club cricketers
Living people
Sri Lankan cricketers
Ruhuna cricketers
Ragama Cricket Club cricketers
Cricketers from Galle